The Saskatchewan Female U18 AAA Hockey League (SFU18AAAHL), formerly the Saskatchewan Female Midget AAA Hockey League, is a U-18 ice hockey league in the province of Saskatchewan, Canada.  The league operates under the supervision of the Hockey Saskatchewan and is the highest level of female minor hockey in the province.

History
The league was founded in 2006 by the SHA to provide an opportunity for female hockey players to play at a more competitive level and assist them in pursuing their hockey futures.  Many SFMAAAHL players who have gone on to play in top-level Canadian Interuniversity Sport or NCAA hockey programs.

Teams

Championship
The winner of each season's playoffs is awarded the Fedoruk Cup as provincial Female Midget AAA champions.  The champion goes on to play a best-of-three series against the champion from Manitoba, the winner of which qualifies for the Esso Cup national championship.  The Notre Dame Hounds and Webyurn Gold Wings are the only two Saskatchewan teams to win the Esso Cup.  The Hounds were runners-up in 2010.

League Champions
2006-07 Notre Dame
2007-08 Notre Dame
2008-09 Prince Albert
2009-10 Notre Dame 
2010-11 Notre Dame National Champions
2011-12 Notre Dame
2012-13 Regina
2013-14 Weyburn National Champions
2014-15 Saskatoon
2015-16 Saskatoon
2016-17 Prince Albert
2017-18 Saskatoon
2018-19 Saskatoon
2019-20 cancelled

References

External links
 SFU18AAAHL.com

Ice hockey leagues in Saskatchewan
Women's ice hockey leagues in Canada
Youth ice hockey leagues in Canada
Sports leagues established in 2006
2006 establishments in Saskatchewan
Hockey Saskatchewan
Women in Saskatchewan